The 1980 Talladega 500 was a NASCAR Winston Cup Series race that took place on August 3, 1980, at Alabama International Motor Speedway in Talladega, Alabama, USA.

The NASCAR Winston Cup Series was also plagued with top teams running big engines and finishing in third place to avoid inspection around the early-1980s.

Background
Talladega Superspeedway, originally known as Alabama International Motor Superspeedway (AIMS), is a motorsports complex located north of Talladega, Alabama. It is located on the former Anniston Air Force Base in the small city of Lincoln. The track is a Tri-oval and was constructed by International Speedway Corporation, a business controlled by the France Family, in the 1960s. Talladega is most known for its steep banking and the unique location of the start/finish line - located just past the exit to pit road. The track currently hosts the NASCAR series such as the Sprint Cup Series, Xfinity Series, and the Camping World Truck Series.

Race report
The race took two hours and fifty-nine minutes in complete. Neil Bonnett defeated Cale Yarborough by six car lengths in front of 70000 spectators.

Bruce Hill would finish last due to an engine issue on lap 12. There were a lot of failures in the race as seven of the top ten starters all blew engines; the last top ten starting driver would end his day on lap 174. 

Hill would make $1,050 in race winnings ($ when adjusted for inflation) while Bonnett would earn $35,675 ($ when adjusted for inflation).

Mercury would score its last NASCAR Cup victory in this race. Coo Coo Marlin would retire from NASCAR after this race while Tennessee's Harry Dinwiddle would make his only NASCAR Cup Series appearance here. Country music singing legend and NASCAR Cup Series driver Marty Robbins would start 37th and finish the race in 13th while driving his 1978 Dodge Magnum number 6.

Qualifying

Finishing order
Section reference: 

 Neil Bonnett†
 Cale Yarborough
 Dale Earnhardt†
 Benny Parsons†
 Harry Gant
 Richard Childress
 Bill Elliott
 Lake Speed
 Kyle Petty
 Dick May†
 Darrell Waltrip*
 Hary Dinwiddle
 Marty Robbins†
 James Hylton†
 Jimmy Means
 Billie Harvey*†
 David Pearson*†
 Richard Petty*
 Slick Johnson†
 Ricky Rudd
 Ronnie Thomas*
 Roger Hamby
 Cecil Gordon†
 Bobby Wawak†
 J.D. McDuffie*†
 Donnie Allison*
 Baxter Price
 Lennie Pond*†
 Tommy Gale*†
 Jody Ridley*
 Terry Labonte*
 Buddy Baker*†
 Frank Warren*
 Tighe Scott*
 Bobby Allison*
 Rick Wilson*
 Coo Coo Marlin*†
 Buddy Arrington*
 Dave Marcis*
 Ferrel Harris*†
 Bruce Hill*

† signifies that the driver is known to be deceased 
* Driver failed to finish race

Standings after the race

References

Talladega 500
Talladega 500
NASCAR races at Talladega Superspeedway